FC Dinamo-UVD Osh is a Kyrgyzstani football club based in Osh that plays in the top division  the Kyrgyzstan League. Founded in 1993

History 
1993: Founded as FC Dinamo Osh.
1996: Merged with Alay Osh to FC Dinamo-Alay Osh.
2002: Renamed as Dinamo-UVD Osh.

Achievements 
Kyrgyzstan League:
3rd place: 1996

Kyrgyzstan Cup:
Finalist: 1997, 1998, 2000

Current squad

External links 
Career stats by KLISF

Football clubs in Kyrgyzstan